Saidpur is a village in the Kotli District of Azad Kashmir, Pakistan.   Neighbouring settlements include Bindian and Chagrianda.

References

Populated places in Kotli District